Geertrui Mieke De Ketelaere (born 14 December 1970) is a Belgian civil engineer and promoter of ethical, reliable, and sustainable artificial intelligence (AI). In her public presentations and books, she focuses on a simple explanation of the concept of AI and indicates which steps are required for a correct and ethical way of adopting this technology. She is an adjunct professor at Vlerick Business School and part-time AI Director at IMEC, and was appointed a Digital Mind by the Belgian federal government.. In 2018, she was nominated as Belgium's ICT Woman of the Year.

Biography

Early life and education 
Geertrui Mieke De Ketelaere was born as a second child in Belgium in 1970. After obtaining a Master of Science in Engineering focused on Electromechanics at the KIHO Campus of KULeuven, she started a Master of Science in Engineering specializing in Engineering cybernetics at the University of Stuttgart.
In 1995, she started a PhD in AI at the University of Auckland, investigating the use of AI in healthcare. A year later De Ketelaere decided to stop this research due to a misalignment between her academic beliefs and the medical world.

Career 
De Ketelaere started her professional career in New Zealand as a business analyst at QED Software. In 1999, she returned to Europe to support Silicon Valley startups opening branches in Europe. After this, she joined CrossWorlds software, and when this was acquired by IBM in 2002 she returned to Belgium. She worked briefly at SAP, then at Microsoft for five years in different functions.

In 2007 she accepted an offer at SAS, and in 2010 she joined Selligent. In 2011 she returned to SAS. During this period, De Ketelaere also worked as a guest lecturer at different business schools, including Vlerick, ISDI, and Nyenrode Business University.

In 2018, De Ketelaere was nominated by Trends as ICT Woman of the Year. In 2019, De Ketelaere accepted a position as AI Director at IMEC.

Early in 2021 De Ketelaere published her first book, Mens versus Machine,  in which she demystifies the AI hype and explains in simple words what AI means for our society. In the same year, she was appointed a Digital Mind by the Belgian federal government.
While continuing part-time as AI Director at IMEC, she started operating as an independent consultant, assisting various companies with AI topics and contributing to various media interviews and opinion pieces

In November 2021, she was appointed as an adjunct professor of AI at Vlerick Business School.

Publications

References

External links 
 Personal website

21st-century Belgian engineers
1970 births
Living people